The 5th Dáil was elected at the June 1927 general election on 9 June 1927 and met on 23 June 1927. The members of Dáil Éireann, the house of representatives of the Oireachtas (legislature) of the Irish Free State, are known as TDs. The 5th Dáil was dissolved on 25 August 1927 by Governor-General Tim Healy, at the advice of the President of the Executive Council W. T. Cosgrave. The 5th Dáil is the shortest Dáil in the history of the state, lasting only  days.

Composition of the 5th Dáil

Cumann na nGaedheal, denoted with bullet, formed the 3rd Executive Council of the Irish Free State.

Graphical representation
This is a graphical comparison of party strengths in the 5th Dáil from June 1927. This was not the official seating plan.

Ceann Comhairle
On 23 June 1927, Michael Hayes (CnaG), who had been Ceann Comhairle since 1922, was proposed by W. T. Cosgrave and seconded by Thomas Johnson for the position, and was approved without a vote. On 1 July 1927, James Dolan (CnaG) was proposed by Eamonn Duggan as Leas-Cheann Comhairle. He was approved by a vote of 54 to 20.

TDs by constituency
The list of the 153 TDs elected, is given in alphabetical order by Dáil constituency.

Changes

After the dissolution of the Dáil, Independent TDs Bryan Cooper (Dublin County), John Daly (Cork East), Myles Keogh (Dublin City South) and Vincent Rice (Dublin City South) joined Cumann na nGaedheal, standing for the party in the September general election.

References

External links
Houses of the Oireachtas: Debates: 5th Dáil

 
05
5th Dáil